The Brown County Art Colony is an artist colony formed in Nashville and Brown County, Indiana.

Adolph Shulz is considered to be the founder of the colony, encouraging many Indiana and regional artists to come to Brown County to paint.  Though artists such as William McKendree Snyder had been coming to Brown County as early as 1870, the colony is considered to have been firmly established in 1907 when the noted painter T. C. Steele moved there.  The dean of Indiana painters, Steele built a home and studio on a large plot of land west of Nashville near Belmont and made it his permanent home.  Its proximity to Indiana University in Bloomington allowed Steele to accept a position as artist in residence there in 1922.

An art association was incorporated in 1926 with Carl Graf as the first president.  In 1954, the association split into two organizations:  The Brown County Art Gallery and Museum and The Brown County Art Guild.  Both organizations continue to maintain galleries in Nashville in which art created by the early artists is displayed along with the art of contemporary members which is for sale. 

Some of the noted Brown County artists include:
 Adam Emory Albright
 Patty Bartels
 Gustave Baumann
 Olive Beem
 Dale Bessire
 C. Curry Bohm
 Anthony Buchta
 V. J. Cariani
 Dale Cassiday
 C. Carey Cloud
 Evelynne Mess Daily
 Alexis J. Fournier
 Edwin Fulwider
 Marie Goth
 Carl Graf
 Genevieve Goth Graf
 Louis Oscar Griffith
 John Hafen
 Glen Cooper Henshaw
 Georges LaChance
 Leota Loop
 Karl Martz (potter)
 Adrian J. Miller
 Chelsea Noggle
 Robert Marshall Root
 Paul Turner Sargent
 Ada Walter Shulz
 Adolph Shulz
 T. C. Steele
 Will Vawter
 Frederick W. Rigley
 William Zimmerman

Notes

References
 Burnet, Mary Q. Art and Artists of Indiana. New York; The Century Co., 1921.
 Simon, Rita  Artists of Southern Indiana  1986
 Judd, Barbara  and M. Joanne Nesbit  Those Brown County Artists  1993

External links

 Brown County Art Gallery
 Artwork by C. Curry Bohm

American artist groups and collectives
Landscape art by school
Indiana culture
Tourist attractions in Brown County, Indiana
Art museums and galleries in Indiana